St Cuthbert's Catholic High School is a boys-only Roman Catholic secondary school with academy status located on Gretna Road in the Benwell Hill area of Newcastle upon Tyne, England.

Admissions
St Cuthbert's is a seven-form entry school. The school admits students of all faiths, but Roman Catholic children take priority.

History
St Cuthbert's Grammar School was opened in Westmorland Road, Elswick, on 16 August 1881, largely due to the efforts of Bishop James Chadwick and his successor Bishop John Bewick building upon the foundations of the Catholic Collegiate School established in 1870 in Eldon Square. Shortly afterward the School moved to larger premises in Bath Lane in the centre of the city. In 1922 the School transferred to the present site on Benwell Hill. Part of the school (1922 Block – now demolished) was built directly over the Vallum (rear ditch) of Hadrian's Wall. During WWII, boys were evacuated to Cockermouth in what is now Cumbria. In 2011 the School again became single site on the completion of the Building Schools for the Future work, the former Lower School buildings on Fox & Hounds Lane having been demolished.

It was a direct grant grammar school until September 1977, then began to take a comprehensive intake.

The school converted to academy status in March 2012.

Principals
Since 1881 there have been 7 clergymen as Head:
 Canon Wickwar
 Fr. Magill
 Monsignor Horace K. Mann
 Monsignor Jeffrey
 Monsignor Canon Cunningham
 Canon M. Cassidy,
 Fr. M. Walsh
and three lay Headteachers: 
 Mr E. Lovell
 Mr J. G Murphy
Mrs C. Davison
The incumbent is:
 Mr Daniel P. Murray

Academic statistics 
St. Cuthbert's was 662nd in the Financial Times Top 1000 Schools 2008 – 17th of 34 schools in the North East to make the list.

Notable alumni
 Kenneth Allott – poet
 Flt Lt Dominic Bruce OBE MC AFM MA KSG RAF – World War II Escaper, the 'medium-sized man' of Colditz Castle
 John Carver – football player and coach
 Ryan Donaldson – footballer
 Declan Donnelly OBE – Dec of Ant & Dec
 Admiral Sir Nigel Essenhigh – First Sea Lord from 2001–02 of the Royal Navy
 Sir Terry Farrell – architect
 Sir Anthony Grabham – President from 2002–03 of the British Medical Association, and Chairman from 1993–2005 of the BMJ Group
 Mick Herron - mystery and thriller novelist
 Alan Hull – Musician
 Paul Kennedy – historian and writer
 Jack Lambert - professional footballer
 Rt Rev Hugh Lindsay – Bishop of Hexham & Newcastle from 1974–92
 Rt Rev Joseph McCormack – Bishop of Hexham & Newcastle from 1937–58
 Cecil McGivern CBE – BBC executive, and Controller of BBC One from 1950–57
 Lawrie McMenemy – football coach
 John Middleton – Vicar Ashley Thomas in Emmerdale
 Lee Novak – footballer 
 Gordon Sumner (Sting) – singer in the band The Police
 Neil Tennant – Singer in the band Pet Shop Boys
 Rt Rev Joseph Thorman – Bishop of Hexham & Newcastle from 1925–36  
 Tom Tuohy CBE – put out the Windscale fire in October 1957
 Rt Rev Frank White – Assistant Bishop of Newcastle (Anglican)
 Liam Noble – Professional footballer
 John Nichol (RAF officer)  - Royal Airforce Navigator
Joey Batey - Actor

References

Further reading
 The Story of St. Cuthbert's Grammar School, Rev C. Hart (1940)

External links
 Home page
 Statistics
 EduBase

News items
 Chemistry explosion in 2003

Boys' schools in Tyne and Wear
Secondary schools in Newcastle upon Tyne
Educational institutions established in 1881
Catholic secondary schools in the Diocese of Hexham and Newcastle
1881 establishments in England
Academies in Newcastle upon Tyne